Antonio 'Toni' Lao Doña (born 17 January 1984 in Barcelona, Catalonia) is a Spanish footballer who plays for Andorran club Inter Club d'Escaldes as a central midfielder.

References

External links

1984 births
Living people
Footballers from Barcelona
Spanish footballers
Association football midfielders
Segunda División players
Segunda División B players
Tercera División players
RCD Espanyol B footballers
UDA Gramenet footballers
CE Sabadell FC footballers
CF Badalona players
Primera Divisió players
UE Sant Julià players
Inter Club d'Escaldes players
Spanish expatriate footballers
Expatriate footballers in Andorra
Spanish expatriate sportspeople in Andorra